Habibul Hasan Hamid (born 11 March 1942) is a former Indian association football player. He was a player of the Indian team that finished as runners up in the 1964 AFC Asian Cup. He also represented India at the 1960 Summer Olympics. He also represented the nation in many other International tournaments.

Honours

India
AFC Asian Cup runners-up: 1964

References

External links
 

Footballers at the 1960 Summer Olympics
Olympic footballers of India
Indian footballers
India international footballers
1964 AFC Asian Cup players
Footballers from Hyderabad, India
Living people
1942 births
Association footballers not categorized by position